David Evans (born January 22, 1944) is an American ethnomusicologist and director of the Ethnomusicology/Regional Studies program at the Rudi E. Scheidt School of Music in the University of Memphis, where he has worked since 1978.

Life and career
He was born in Boston, Massachusetts, United States. He studied at UCLA and began making trips to the southern states in the 1960s to research and record blues musicians. He recorded the singer Jack Owens in 1970 and later produced records for Jessie Mae Hemphill and other blues musicians. His research work in the Deep South was mentioned extensively in Robert Palmer's tome, Deep Blues.

As head of the University of Memphis's High Water Recording Company, he made numerous recordings of performers in the Memphis area, some of whom were not previously documented. He has written or edited a number of books on the blues and has written liner notes and booklets for various music releases. He won a Grammy Award in 2003 for "Best Album Notes" for the CD Screamin' and Hollerin' the Blues: The Worlds of Charley Patton.

Evans has also been performing in the United States and elsewhere, both solo and with the Last Chance Jug Band. His discography includes Match Box Blues (Inside Sounds, 2002); I Didn't Know About You (Heavywood, 2005); Needy Times (Inside Sounds, 2007) and Shake That Thing! (Inside Sounds, 2006).

Published work
 Tommy Johnson (London: Studio Vista, 1971)
 Big Road Blues: Tradition and Creativity in the Folk Blues (Berkeley: University of California Press, 1982)
 The NPR Curious Listener's Guide to the Blues (New York: Perigee, 2005)

Further reading
 Cooper, Jack T. (2005). "David Evans". The Greenwood Encyclopedia of African American Folklore. Anand Prahlad, ed. Vol. 1, A–F. Greenwood Press. .

References

External links
Myspace profile
AllMusic profile

1944 births
Living people
American musicologists
American anthropologists
American blues singers
American blues guitarists
American male guitarists
Grammy Award winners
University of Memphis faculty
20th-century American guitarists
20th-century American male musicians
21st-century American guitarists
21st-century American male musicians